Anubhava Mantapa, established by Basavanna in the 12th century C.E. is located in Basavakalyan in Bidar district of Karnataka. It is the first religious parliament in the world, whose literal meaning is "experience pavilion", and was an academy of mystics, saints and philosophers of the lingayat faith in the 12th century. It was the fountainhead of all religious and philosophical thought pertaining to the lingayat. It was presided over by the mystic Allama Prabhu and numerous Sharanas from all over Karnataka and other parts of India were participants. This institution was also the fountainhead of the Vachana literature which was used as the vector to propagate Veerashaiva religious and philosophical thought. Other giants of veerashaiva theosophy like Akka Mahadevi, Channabasavanna and Basavanna himself were participants in the Anubhava Mantapa. The Anubhava Mantapa is also called the Mahaamane.

History
Anubhava Mantapa/Shivanubhav Mantapa was an academy of mystics, saints and philosophers of the ‘Lingayath's’ faith in the 12th century. It was the fountainhead of all religious and philosophical thought pertaining to the Hindu and shaivite values, ethics. It was presided over by the mystic Allama Prabhu and numerous Sharanas from all over Karnataka and other parts of India were participants. The Sharanas belonged to all strata. Everybody (there was no discrimination - Men, Women, Dalits, Shudras, Brahmins, Vaishyas - all were one, and they were all classless but ardent followers of Lord Shiva) provided equal opportunities by the social reformer Basaveshwara and made them to depend on their own work, think rational and contribute back to society through "Daasoha". This institution was also the fountainhead of the Vachana literature which was used as the vector to propagate Sharana's views and philosophical thought. Other Sharana's and Sharanes theosophy like Akka Mahadevi, Channabasavanna were participants in the Anubhava Mantapa. It was a unique socio spiritual revolution to establish an egalitarian society.

The Shivanubhav Mantap worked to build a Vibrant casteless, creedless Society with full of Human Values propagated through Vachanas and primary deity of Lord Shiva, but in non mainstream manner.

The movement taken over by Basava through Anubhava Mantapa became the basis of a sect of Human values. It gave rise to a system of ethics and education at once simple and exalted. It sought to inspire ideals of social and religious freedom, such as no previous faith of Earth had done. In the medieval age which was characterized by Islamic invasions and oppression, it helped to shed a ray of light and faith on the homes and hearts of people. But the spirit soon disappeared after the intermarriage that Basava facilitated came to an abrupt end when the couple were punished for the same by the King. The dream of the classless society was shaken and Basava soon realised the meek picture and left for Kudala Sangama and a year later died.

The movement gave a literature of considerable value in the vernacular language of the country, the literature which attained the dignity of a classical tongue. Its aim was the elimination of the barriers of caste and to remove untouchability, raising the untouchable to the equal of the high born. The sanctity of family relations and the improvement in the status of womanhood were striven for while at the same time the importance of rites and rituals, of fasts and pilgrimages was reduced. It encouraged learning and contemplation of God by means of love and faith. The excesses of polytheism were deplored and the idea of monotheism was encouraged. The movement tended, in many ways, to raise the nation generally to a higher level of capacity both in thought and action. However, the sect failed to bring about a completely classless society.

References

External links
Anubhava Mantapa
Facebook

Lingayatism
History of Karnataka